Ernst Gunnar Åkerlund (20 November 1923 – 4 October 2006) was a Swedish sprint canoer who competed in the late 1940s and early 1950s. He won two Olympic medals in the K-2 10000 m event: a gold in 1948 and a silver in 1952.

Åkerlund won three medals at the ICF Canoe Sprint World Championships with two golds (K-2 10000 m: 1950, K-4 1000 m: 1948) and a silver (K-4 1000 m: 1950).

References

External links
 
 
 

1923 births
2006 deaths
People from Nyköping Municipality
Swedish male canoeists
Olympic canoeists of Sweden
Canoeists at the 1948 Summer Olympics
Canoeists at the 1952 Summer Olympics
Olympic gold medalists for Sweden
Olympic silver medalists for Sweden
Olympic medalists in canoeing
ICF Canoe Sprint World Championships medalists in kayak
Medalists at the 1952 Summer Olympics
Medalists at the 1948 Summer Olympics
Sportspeople from Södermanland County